Tokudome is a Japanese surname. Notable people with the surname include:

, Japanese mixed martial artist
, Japanese motorcycle racer

Japanese-language surnames